Aurelio González Puente (born 26 July 1940) is a Spanish former road bicycle racer who won the Mountains classification in the 1968 Tour de France and the Mountains classification in the 1967 Giro d'Italia. He also won stages in the Tour de France, Giro d'Italia, Tour de Suisse and Dauphiné Libéré.

Major results

1967
 Giro d'Italia
 1st  Mountains classification
 1st Stage 22a
 3rd Overall Vuelta a España
1968
 Tour de France
 1st  Mountains classification 
 1st Stage 6

External links

1940 births
Living people
Spanish male cyclists
Spanish Tour de France stage winners
Spanish Giro d'Italia stage winners
People from Asón-Agüera
Tour de Suisse stage winners
Cyclists from Cantabria